Tolo Tolo is a 2020 Italian comedy film directed by and starring Checco Zalone, in his directorial debut.

The film grossed €46.2 million ($52.2 million) and became the fifth highest-grossing film of all time in Italy, and  the 21st highest-grossing film of 2020.

Plot

Checco is a young Apulian entrepreneur dreamer who has opened a sushi restaurant in his town Spinazzola. However, after one month, the restaurant goes bankrupt and he chooses to emigrate to Africa to escape from debt. Here he adapts to being a waiter in a resort in Kenya, but at the outbreak of a civil war he decides to embark on a stowaway trip on a boat for migrants to Europe and chooses to do it with his African friends. However, he would not like to return to Italy, but rather to go to Liechtenstein where banking secrecy is in force and there is a lower tax burden than in Italy.

Cast
Checco Zalone as Pierfrancesco "Checco" Zalone
Souleymane Sylla as Oumar
Manda Touré as Idjaba
Nassor Said Birya as Doudou
Barbara Bouchet as Mrs. Inge
Alexis Michalik as Alexandre Lemaitre
Arianna Scommegna as Nunzia
Antonella Attili as Mrs. Lella
Gianni D'Addario as Gramegna
Nicola Nocella as Lawyer Russo
Diletta Acquaviva as Barbara (second wife)
Maurizio Bousso as Boy in Agadez
Sara Putignano as Nicla (first wife)
Nicola Di Bari as Uncle Nicola
 Ira Fronten as Maitresse Agadez
Badara Seck

Additionally, Nichi Vendola, Enrico Mentana, and Massimo Giletti appear as themselves.

Reception
The film opened with a record-breaking first day gross of €8.7 million, surpassing the previous record achieved by Quo Vado? (2016), in which Checco Zalone had also starred in. By 8 March 2020, the film had grossed €46 million when cinemas in Italy were closed due to the coronavirus lockdown. The film was less well-received than Zalone's previous feature film efforts, with criticisms being aimed at the inconsistent script, direction and the film being less funny, though praising the attempt at discussing a more socially relevant topic.

See also

 List of highest-grossing films in Italy
 European migrant crisis
 Migrants' African routes

References

External links

Italian comedy films
2020 comedy films
2020 films
2020 directorial debut films
Films set in Kenya
Films about immigration to Italy
2020s Italian-language films
2020s Italian films